Carl Fullerton is an American make-up artist. He was nominated for two Academy Awards in the category Best Makeup and Hairstyling for the films Remo Williams: The Adventure Begins and Philadelphia.

Selected filmography 
 Remo Williams: The Adventure Begins (1985)
 Philadelphia (1993; co-nominated with Alan D'Angerio)

References

External links 

Living people
Year of birth missing (living people)
Place of birth missing (living people)
American make-up artists